North Dulwich railway station is in the London Borough of Southwark in Dulwich, south London. The station and all trains serving it are operated by Southern, and it is on the boundary of Travelcard Zone 2 and Travelcard Zone 3 (Travelcards with either zone are valid).

The station was designed in a hybrid classical style by Charles Barry Jr. and built in 1868 by the London, Brighton and South Coast Railway. It is listed Grade II on the National Heritage List for England as is the K6 telephone kiosk inside the portico of the station.

Services 
All services at North Dulwich are operated by Southern using  EMUs.

The typical off-peak service in trains per hour is:
 4 tph to  via 
 2 tph to  via 
 2 tph to  via 

During the evenings (after approximately 20:00), the service between London Bridge and Beckenham Junction is reduced to hourly. This service does not run on Sundays.

From May 2022 there will be 2 additional services to London Bridge, departing at 07:59 and 08:29

Connections
London Buses routes 37, 42 and P4 serve the station.

Gallery

References

External links

Dulwich
Railway stations in the London Borough of Southwark
Former London, Brighton and South Coast Railway stations
Railway stations in Great Britain opened in 1868
Railway stations served by Govia Thameslink Railway
Grade II listed railway stations
Grade II listed buildings in the London Borough of Southwark
Charles Barry Jr. buildings